This is a list of German-language playwrights.

A 
Herbert Achternbusch

B 
Wolfgang Bauer (1941–2005)
Thomas Bernhard
Leo Birinski
Nicolai Borger
Bertolt Brecht
Georg Büchner

D 
Friedrich Dürrenmatt

F 
Gustav Freytag

G 
Johann Wolfgang von Goethe (1749–1832)

H 
Peter Handke
Gerhart Hauptmann
Wolfgang Hildesheimer
Ödön von Horváth (1901–1938)

J 
Elfriede Jelinek
Hanns Johst

K 
Georg Kaiser
Heinrich von Kleist
Karl Kraus
Franz Xaver Kroetz

L 
Else Lasker-Schüler
Gotthold Ephraim Lessing

M 
Andreas Mand
Lucas Maius
Klaus Mann
Marius von Mayenburg (born 1972)
Heiner Müller
Robert Musil
Johann Nestroy

P 
Ulrich Plenzdorf

S 
Friedrich Schiller (1759–1805)
Roland Schimmelpfennig

T 
Ludwig Tieck
Ernst Toller
Kurt Tucholsky
Peter Turrini

W 
Robert Walser
Frank Wedekind
Peter Weiss
Franz Werfel
Urs Widmer (1938–2014)

Z 
Carl Zuckmayer
Stefan Zweig

See also 

List of Germans
List of German journalists
List of German-language authors
List of German-language philosophers
List of German-language poets

External links

Lists of dramatists and playwrights
Lists of writers by language
 
Playwrights